Charles H. Whaley (dates of birth and death not known) was an Anglo-Argentine first-class cricketer and footballer.

Background 
Whaley played football as a striker for the Belgrano Athletic Club and was the leading scorer for the club in the 1906 Tie Cup with 13 goals, including scoring Belgrano's only goal in their 10–1 Final defeat to Alumni. The following season, he was Belgrano's leading goalscorer in the Copa de Honor Municipalidad de Buenos Aires, with 6 goals. In October 1907, he appeared for the Argentina national team against Uruguay at Montevideo. He was again the leading goalscorer in the 1908 Tie Cup, with 5. In addition to playing international football, Whaley also played two first-class cricket matches for the Argentine cricket team against the touring Marylebone Cricket Club in February 1912, scoring 31 runs in these two matches, with a highest score of 21 not out. He also bowled 16 wicketless overs across both matches.

References

External links

Date of birth unknown
Date of death unknown
Argentine people of English descent
Argentine footballers
Argentine Primera División players
Argentina international footballers
Argentine cricketers
Association footballers not categorized by position